Kaper is a Dutch surname. Notable people with the surname include:

 Bronisław Kaper (1902–1983), Polish film composer
 Hans G. Kaper (born 1936), Dutch-American mathematician
 Jacobus Kaper (born 1931), biochemist and virologist
 Tasso J. Kaper (born 1964), American mathematician

Dutch-language surnames